Earth Atlantis is a 2D side-scrolling shooter video game developed and published by Thai indie studio Pixel Perfex Studio for the Microsoft Windows, PlayStation 4, Nintendo Switch, and Xbox One. Earth Atlantis was released on October 5, 2017.

Gameplay 
In the game, the player controls a submarine as they explore the depths of a post-apocalyptic Earth. After the player chooses one of many underwater vehicles, they utilize their map in order to find their next objective and fight a variety of bosses along the way. The player can hop around while defeating smaller enemies in between.

Reception 

According to review aggregator Metacritic, Earth Atlantis received "mixed or average" reception with a score of 71 out of 100 for the Switch release. Nintendo Life gave the game an 8/10 rating.

Earth Atlantis won the “Excellence in Art” award – BIC Festival 2016 in Busan, South Korea and the “Vermilion Gate” award (Best in Show) during the 5th BitSummit 2017, Kyoto, Japan.

Sequel 
Pixel Perfex officially announced that they are currently working on a sequel and will be released sometime in the future.

References

External links 
 
2017 video games
IOS games
Linux games
MacOS games
PlayStation 4 games
Nintendo Switch games
Single-player video games
Video games developed in Thailand
Windows games
Xbox One games
Post-apocalyptic video games
Indie video games
Video games with underwater settings
Headup Games games